AeroMobile Communications Limited is a registered mobile network operator for the aviation industry and is based in the UK. It provides technology and services that allow the safe use of passengers' own mobile phones while inflight. A subsidiary of Panasonic Avionics Corporation  its services are often installed alongside Panasonic's Wi-Fi network and can be installed either at the point of aircraft manufacture or retro-fitted across both Airbus and Boeing aircraft. Panasonic Avionic's Wi-Fi network and AeroMobile's mobile phone network are complimentary services and provide passengers with a choice of inflight connectivity options.

Since launching the service in March 2008, over 40 million passengers have connected to the network and AeroMobile now has over 20 airline partners offering passengers inflight voice, SMS and data services on selected, connected flights. Airline partners include Emirates, Etihad, KLM, Lufthansa, SAS, Virgin Atlantic, Singapore Airlines, Cathay Pacific and Turkish Airlines.

In December 2015 AeroMobile launched the world's first 3.5G inflight mobile network with Air Berlin. The 3.5G network provides passengers with a substantial increase in data speeds, faster browsing and quicker posts.

Company milestones

Customers
  Aer Lingus - Launched 2013: A330-200s and A330-300s
  Air France - Launched 2013: B777
  Air Serbia - Launched 2015: A319 and A320
  Alitalia- Launched 2015: A330-200s
  Cathay Pacific - Launched 2016: A350
  Emirates Airline - Launched 2008: A330-200s, A340-300s, A340-500s, B777-200, B777-300ERs, GSM and GPRS services
  Etihad - Launched 2012: A330s, A380 and B777-300ERs
  Eurowings - Launched 2016: A330
  EVA Air - Launched 2014: B777
  KLM - Launched 2013: B777
  Kuwait Airways - Launched 2016: B777
  Malaysia Airlines - Launched 2018: A350-900, GSM and GPRS services
  Malindo Air - Launched 2015: B737-900s
  Lufthansa - Launched 2014: A330-300s, B747-400s, B747-800s, A380-800s, A340-300s, GSM and GPRS services
    SAS - Launched 2012: B737s GSM and GPRS (email) services
  Qatar Airways - Launched 2014: A330-200
  Singapore Airlines Launched 2013: B777-300ER
  SWISS Launched 2016: B777 and A330
  Turkish Airlines - A330-300s and B777-300ERs
  Virgin Atlantic - Launched 2011: A330, B747-400 GSM and GPRS services

See also
Aircell
Connexion by Boeing
Inmarsat
Mobile phones on aircraft
OnAir

References

External links
 

Mobile phone companies of the United Kingdom
Travel technology
Telenor